Abd al-Rahman Furaih, born in the town of Al-Sabaan in Hail in 1957, is a Saudi historian, author, and academic; a member of the Saudi Shura Council, and has many published books. He received a doctorate in history and civilization, took a course in management at the University of the Mediterranean in Malta, studied English in San Diego, USA, and is currently a faculty member at Imam Muhammad bin Saud Islamic University in Riyadh.

Life and positions 

 He worked at the Arabic Language Institute at King Saud University in Riyadh.
 Worked in the Emirate of Hail Region: Director of the Department of Development and Coordination of Services, then Director of Public Relations, then Secretary-General of the District Council
 The Director of the Consultants Department then retired early (in 1426 AH).
 Member of the Shura Council during the period (1426-1430 AH).
 Head of the Cultural Activities Department at the Culture and Arts Association (Hail Branch)
 And Vice President of the Literary Club in Hail.
 Writer for Al-Jazeera newspaper.
 Participated in several seminars, conferences, and scientific meetings inside and outside the Kingdom and contributed to the arbitration of several books and research.
 He gave many lectures on thought, culture, history, literature, and development.
 Member of the teaching staff at Imam Muhammad bin Saud Islamic University in Riyadh - Professor of History and Civilization (collaborator).
 He was the Owner of the first forum (Cultural Salon) in Hail (Arba’i Al-Fraih).
 Member of the Saudi Historical Society.
 Member of the History and Archeology Society of the Cooperation Council for the Arab States of the Gulf.
 Member of the Union of Arab Historians in Cairo.

Works 

 "Mahaju Albahth Altarikhi Waruya Nakdeeya Fi Baath Almasadir Wa Aldirasat Alhadeetha" (The historical research method and a critical vision in some modern sources and studies) (Al-Maarifa Bulletin Publication)
 "Kifaar" (Wasteland), Published by the General Presidency for Youth Welfare (the General Sports Authority).
 "Banu Bakir Bin Wail Minthu Duhoor Alislam Hatta Bidayat Alasr Alamawi" (Banu Bakr bin Wael from the advent of Islam until the beginning of the Umayyad era) (Ibn Hazm Publication)
 "Alkabail Alarabiya Fi Khurasan Wa Bilad Ma Waraa Alnahr Fi Alasr Alamawi" (Arab tribes in Khurasan and Transoxiana in the Umayyad era) (Ibn Jazm Bulletin Publication)

Published researches 
• "Lamahat Min Tareekh Fadek" (Glimpses of Fadak's history).

• "Masader Altareekh Alislami Wa Naqd Alriwayat" (Sources of Islamic history and criticism of novels).

• "Alarab Fi Khurasan Wa Bilad Ma Wara Alnahar" (The Arabs in Khurasan and Transoxiana).

• "Ayam Alaarab Madat Altareekh" (Arab Days, history, and language literature).

• "Ntharat Fi Althakafa, Althaqafa, Almafhoom, Almalamih" (Looks at culture, the concept, the components, and the features).

• "Falin Alfinlandi Wa Ibn Alfarith Wa Suwar Min Shamalai Jazeerat Alarab" (Valin Al-Finnish, Ibn Al-Farid, and Tyre from the north of the Arabian Peninsula).

• "Zaroud Wa Shayateen Alshir" (Zaroud and hair demons).

• "Mantikat Hail: Banurama Almakan Wa Alssukan" (Hail region: a panorama of the place and the population).

TV Shows 
• Presented the program of the forum on the cultural channel.

• Presents a program (History and Civilization) on the cultural channel.

• The historical agreement between Al-Hussein and Muawiyah.

• Meeting with Dr. Abdul Rahman Al-Fraih Al-Tamimi. Bayader Al-Majd Channel Program (1432 AH).

References 

1957 births
Arab
Arab historians
Living people